Bridgeport High School is the comprehensive four-year public high school located in the city of  Bridgeport, West Virginia, in Harrison County that operates as part of the county of the Harrison County School District.

The current BHS building opened in the 1969 and sits on the   campus. Since then, several major additions have been added to accommodate the increasing enrollment.  The first addition was completed in the 1981. The second addition was completed in the 1992 which included the two state of the art computer labs. That brought the building to a total area of the approximately  it occupies. The current principal is Matthew Egbert Demotto

Awards and recognition
During the 2005–06 school year, the Bridgeport High School was awarded the Blue Ribbon School Award of Excellence by the United States Department of Education, the highest award the American school system can receive.

In the academic competitions for the 2006–2007 school year, the BHS took the first place (in some form) in the state for the Science Bowl, the Quiz-Bowl and the Scholastic Chess.

In the 2007's the Science Bowl team won the first-place position in the National Science Bowl Hydrogen Fuel Cell Model Car Challenge King of the Hill administered by the United States Department of Energy.

During the 2007–2008 school year the school was ranked as the number one high school in the state of West Virginia by the WV Report and had the total of 8 National Merit Scholars.

Feeding pattern
Bridgeport High School students come from a three-feeder school area. Johnson Elementary School and Bridgeport Middle School are located adjacent to BHS on a campus, and the third feeder is Simpson Elementary. Students enrolled in these four schools live in Bridgeport, Anmoore, and surrounding unincorporated areas, such as Quiet Dell, Johnstown, Maple Lake, Corbin Branch, Oral Lake, Brushy Fork, and Romines Mills.

Athletics and academics

Bridgeport High School has a total of 49 State Championships, in Academics and Athletics, and 1 National Championship. 3 State Championships in Academics in Science Bowl, which also won Nationals, T.E.A.M.S (1) and in Quiz Bowl (1). 47 State Championships in Athletics in Football (10), Boys' Golf (5), Cheerleading (4), Girls' Swimming (3), Boys' Basketball (2), Baseball (8), Boys' Cross Country (3), Girls' Soccer (1), Girls' Basketball (1), Boys' Swimming (2), Girls' Tennis (1), Boys' Tennis (1) Boys' Track and Field (2), Girls' Track and Field (3) and Girls’ Volleyball (1).

Bridgeport has also placed state runner up a total of 38 times.

The High School also participates in Softball, Danceline and Wrestling but are yet to win or place runner up in any of these sports.

Bridgeport will move from competing in the AA to the AAA class starting in the 2020–2021 school year.

State championships

Boys' Track and Field (2):

2014 (AA)
2018 (AA)

Girls' Track and Field (3):

2014 (AA)
2016 (AA)
2018 (AA)

Football (10):

2019 (AA) - 21–14, Bluefield
2015 (AA) - 39–0, Tolsia
2014 (AA) - 43–7, Frankfort
2013 (AA) - 14–13, Wayne
2000 (AA) - 14–6, Wayne
1988 (AA) - 29–28, Winfield (4OT)
1986 (AA) - 10–7, Tucker County
1979 (AAA) - 20–7, St. Albans
1972 (AAA) - 16–14, Dupont
1955 (A)* - 39–13, Webster Springs *1955-1957 WV divided schools into three classes, AA, A & B.  These were changed in 1958 to AAA, AA, A. The BHS 1955 title is often confused to be a small school title, when in fact it was a medium-sized school title.

Quiz Bowl (1):

2013

Boys' Cross Country (3):

2013 (AA-A)
2014 (AA-A)
2016 (AA-A)

Girls' Soccer (1):

2012 (AA) 3–2, Fairmont Senior

Girls' Basketball (1):

2013 (AA) 44–27, Westside

Boys' Swimming (2):

2019
2010

Girls' Swimming (3):

2008
2000
1999

Science Bowl (2):

2007
2010

Golf (5):

2003 (AA)
1994 (AA-A)
1993 (AA-A)
1992 (AA-A)
1990 (AA-A)

Cheerleading (5):

2019 (AA)
2001 (AA)
1998 (AA)
1996 (AAA)
1995 (AA)

Boys' Basketball (2):

2001 (AA) - 68–57, Tug Valley
1993 (AA) - 59–50, Oceana

Baseball (8):

2019 (AA) 5–2, Frankfort
2018 (AA) 17–15, Wayne
2017 (AA) 14–3, Weir (6 innings)
2016 (AA) 9–4, Pike View
2015 (AA) 5–0, Chapmanville
2014 (AA) - 5–2, Independence
2000 (AA) - 7–2, Wyoming East
1993 (AA) - 11–4, Pineville

Girls' Tennis (1):

1995 (AA-A)

Boys' Tennis (1):

2015 (AA)

Girls' Volleyball (1):

2018 (AA) defeated Philip Barbour in 5 sets.

Runner's up

Baseball (3):

2010 (AAA) - 0–6, Nitro
1994 (AA) - 0–1, Wayne
1992 (AA) - 1–2, Wayne

Boys' Basketball (1):

1994 (AA) - 61–68, Oceana

Boys' Cross Country (1):

2015 (AA-A)

Girls' Cross Country (1):

2018 (AA)

Girls' Basketball (1):

2012 (AAA) 47–52, Greenbrier East

Cheerleading (11):

2014 (AA)
2013 (AA)
2007 (AAA)
2006 (AAA)
1999 (AA)
1997 (AA)
1995 (AA)
1994 (AA)
1993 (AA)
1992 (AA)
1991 (AA)
1990 (AA-A)

Football (2)*:

2001 (AA) 7-21, Poca 
2020 (AAA) - *Bridgeport was scheduled to play South Charleston for the AAA state championship, but COVID-19 numbers were high in Harrison County & the game was cancelled.  South Charleston was awarded the title by forfeit.

Golf (3):

1989 (AA-A)
1988 (AA-A)
2014 (AA)

Girls' Soccer (2):
 
2013 (AA) 0–1, Sissonville
2014 (AA) 0–5, Charleston Catholic

Boys' Swimming (5):

2013
2012
2011
2009
2008

Girls' Swimming (3):

2019
2007
2002

Boys' Tennis (1):

2013 (AA)

Girls' Tennis (1):

2013 (AA)

Girls' Track and Field (3):

2019 (AA) 
2015 (AA) 
2013 (AA)

Volleyball (1):

2016 (AA) (Philip Barbour, 3 sets)

Controversy
The school was the subject of controversy over a print of artist Warner Sallman's portrait, Head of Christ, that has hung outside the principal's office since the 1970s. Two parents filed a lawsuit against the school in federal district court in Clarksburg, charging the principal, superintendent, and school board with endorsing Christianity over other religions. The parents were represented by the West Virginia chapter of the American Civil Liberties Union and Americans United for Separation of Church and State. The school board accepted an offer from the Alliance Defense Fund to represent the school board, superintendent  and the principal of the high school.

The portrait was stolen from the school on August 17, 2006, after someone broke a window and snatched the picture. The person broke through a window located in the Tech Ed department of the building. The portrait had not been located and the perpetrators were not identified as of November 2006, despite fact that video surveillance footage, fingerprints and DNA evidence were identified at the scene.

On October 6, 2006, the Harrison County School District Board of Education agreed to drop their defense of the case and settle with the case with the ACLU. The settlement ensures that school officials will not restore the portrait or post any other unconstitutional pictures, paintings, posters or other items with religious content.

The school also gained national attention in February 2009 when a theater production of the High School version of the musical "Rent" was canceled due to homosexual content and other themes that families would not find appealing.

Notable alumni
 Babe Barna, former Major League Baseball outfielder.
 Nancy Jacobs, Maryland State Senator.
 Tim Lindsey, former long snapper for the Seattle Seahawks of the NFL
 Harrison Musgrave, baseball player
 Kelli Ward, former Arizona Republican Party chairwoman

References

External links
Bridgeport High School web page
National Center for Education Statistics data for Bridgeport High School
Bridgeport High School online paper
Cross Country and Track Team official site for Bridgeport High School

Public high schools in West Virginia
Schools in Harrison County, West Virginia
School buildings completed in 1963
Bridgeport, West Virginia
1963 establishments in West Virginia